The 2004 Mosconi Cup, the 11th edition of the annual nine-ball pool competition between teams representing Europe and the United States, took place 16–19 December 2004 at the Hotel Zuiderduin in Egmond aan Zee, Netherlands.

Team USA won the Mosconi Cup by defeating Team Europe 12–9.


Teams

 1 Born outside the United States.

Results

Thursday, 16 December

Session 1

Friday, 17 December

Session 2

Session 3

Saturday, 18 December

Session 4

Session 5

Sunday, 19 December

Session 6

Session 7

References

External links
 

Mosconi Cup
Mosconi Cup
Mosconi Cup
Mosconi Cup
Sports competitions in North Holland
Sport in Bergen, North Holland